Großrinderfeld is a municipality in southwestern Germany, in the state of Baden-Württemberg. It is located between Tauberbischofsheim and Würzburg.

Großrinderfeld consists of the four villages of Großrinderfeld, Gerchsheim, Schönfeld and Ilmspan.

History
 Until 1803, Großrinderfeld belonged to the "Kurfürstentum Mainz", then it became part of the Grand Duchy of Baden
 On 25 July 1866 the area of Großrinderfeld and the village Gerchsheim were the place of one of the last combats of the Austro-Prussian War. The Prussians there defeated troops of the South-German allies of Austria during the Campaign of the Main.
 In 1975 the three villages of Gerchsheim, Schönfeld und Ilmspan have been merged with Großrinderfeld to form greater Großrinderfeld

References

External links
 official homepage (German only)
 private site, some English content

Main-Tauber-Kreis